Al-Saan Subdistrict  is a Syrian nahiyah (subdistrict) located in Salamiyah District in Hama.  According to the Syria Central Bureau of Statistics (CBS), Al-Saan Subdistrict had a population of 14366 in the 2004 census.

References 

Saan
Salamiyah District